Vitalie Ciobanu (born 4 May 1964 in Floreşti) is a journalist from the Republic of Moldova. He is the editor in chief of Contrafort
 He is a member of the Writers' Union of Romania, the Moldovan Writers' Union and the Group for Social Dialogue.

Biography
He studied journalism at the University of Chişinău. From 1986 to 1993, he was editor and editor-in-chief at the Hyperion Publishing House. Since 1994, he is editor-in-chief of Contrafort-magazine. He is a member of the International PEN Center (subsidiary Chişinău) since 1995 and president of Moldova PEN Centre since 2004, member of the Writers' Union of Romania since 1993, member of the Moldovan Writers' Union since 1992 and member of the Group for Social Dialogue Bucharest since 2004.

Awards
Prize for debut (prose) of the Moldovan Writers' Union, 1991,
Prize for essay of the Writers' Union of Romania, 1999;
Prize for essay of the Moldovan Writers' Union, 2001.

Works
 "Literature Express. A look at Europe from train's window" (a diary realized with Vasile Garnet); "The Anatomia of geopolitical failure: Republic of Moldova" (political essays), Polirom Publishing House, Iasi, 2005;
 "The Waltz on Scaffold. 30 literary pretexts and one Prague diary", Cartier Publishing House, Chisinau, 2001;
 "The Fear from difference" (articles, essays, literary chronicles), Romanian Cultural Fondation, Bucharest, 1999;
 "The Change Post" (novel), Hyperion Publishing House Chisinau, 1991; – present in "Europaexpress. Ein literarisches Reisebuch". Eichborn, Berlin, 2001; in "The moment of truth", anthology of contemporary Romanian essayists, Dacia Publishing House, Cluj-Napoca, 1996; in "Donumenta", Regensburg-München-Berlin (2004).

Bibliography
Anatomia unui faliment geopolitic: Republica Moldova, România, 2005, editura Polirom .
Frica de diferență. Eseuri și articole, București, 1999 .
Momentul adevărului. Antologie de eseuri românești contemporane, Cluj 1996 .
Schimbarea din strajă. Hyperion, Chișinău 1991 .

References

External links
  Officialwebsite
 Contrafort – 15 ani (Ce înseamnă şi ce a însemnat pentru Dumneavoastră revista „Contrafort”?)
 Romanian Cultural Institute, CONTRAFORT
 Radio Free Europe, Contrafort – o revistă emancipată, îndrăzneaţă, performantă
 Vitalie Cibanu

1964 births
Living people
People from Florești District
Moldova State University alumni
Moldovan writers
Moldovan male writers
Moldovan journalists
Male journalists
Radio Free Europe/Radio Liberty people
Recipients of the Order of Honour (Moldova)